Rewind is the annual year-in-review issue of The Wire, a British music magazine founded in 1982. The year-end issues have been published every January since 1986, adopting the current "Rewind" title in 1997. Each year-end issue has included an annual critics' poll, collating critics' ballots into a list of the year's best releases. The polls survey writers affiliated with the magazine.

Across its history, critics' polls in The Wire have tended to reflect the magazine's eclectic, avant-garde sensibility and coverage of experimental music across a broad variety of genres. The magazine's first few polls were limited to selecting the best jazz LP of the year, in accordance with its original focus on jazz music. As the magazine's coverage expanded, it began incorporating other lists of the best albums in selected non-jazz genres, but kept the jazz poll at the centre. In 1990 the magazine had its first all-genre poll, and the following year the main poll opened to include albums from any musical genre. Beginning in 2011, the main poll expanded to encompass not only albums, but any musical release of any length in any conceivable format. Nevertheless, the poll has typically continued to emphasise releases from the album format above all others.

History

1985–1991: jazz era

The early polls were limited to jazz albums, mirroring the magazine's focus at that time, but the purview gradually expanded; by 1990, the main jazz list was published alongside lists for blues, Latin music, "composition" (i.e., classical music) and "suspect rock" (i.e., experimental rock). The magazine published an all-genre poll for the first time in 1991, a so-called "open vote 'beyond' category" that was still subordinate to the "main" list of jazz and improvised releases. The Mix, a remix album by German electronic group Kraftwerk, was the first release to top an all-genre poll.

1992–2010: Record of the Year

In 1992, The Wire stopped privileging its jazz poll and instead began to designate its all-genre poll as its primary year-end list. The blurb accompanying that year's poll announced that the "main chart takes the form of an all-inclusive, open-ended category—contributors were asked to vote for their favourite records across all genres, from jazz to Techno, opera to Africa, metal to Minimalism." The magazine continued to publish genre-specific lists, including for jazz. In 1993, The Wire started calling its all-genre poll the "Record of the Year".

2011–present: Release of the Year

In 2011, The Wire switched the name of its annual critics' poll from Records of the Year to Releases of the Year. The change meant that critics could cast votes for "any self-contained audio entity, be it a vinyl LP, 12" EP, cassette, CD, download, mixtape, etc." Editor-in-chief Tony Herrington explained the reasoning and observed how it had changed critics' submissions:

The cover design for the 2017 Rewind—published January 2018, issue number 407—was a work of interactive audiovisual art. Using a custom augmented reality app, a smart device's camera would show the abstract magazine cover as a three-dimensional, with accompanying audio. The project was cited in the 2019 book The Fundamentals of Graphic Design as "an immersive and dynamic experience perfectly reflecting the publication's long-running championing of experimental approaches to making and performing music."

Critics' polls

See also
Pazz & Jop – a critics' poll conducted by The Village Voice
HMV's Poll of Polls – music retailer HMV's aggregate year-end poll compiling various publications' polls (including The Wires), published from 1998–2012

Citations

References

External links
Charts at  — includes every Rewind poll since 1994, including genre specialist charts

The Wire (magazine)
1986 establishments in the United Kingdom
Annual events in the United Kingdom
Annual magazine issues
Experimental music
Lists of albums
Opinion polling in the United Kingdom
Recurring events established in 1986